The Quebec Oriental Railway was the name for a railway running along the southern shore of the Gaspe peninsula, Quebec, Canada, opened in 1907 from Matapédia to (eventually) Gaspe Town. The railway was taken over by Canadian National, which then split off its passenger services to VIA Rail, which shuttered the Montreal-Gaspe train line in 2013.

History
The line of the Quebec Oriental began as an endeavour of the Atlantic and Lake Superior Railway, envisioned as a line from Gaspé to the Great Lakes. The project didn't get far, and only constructed a line from Matapédia to Caplan in the 1890s. The Quebec Oriental was chartered to extend the line to New Carlisle, and the Atlantic, Quebec and Western Railway extended it further to Gaspé. The line was then fully taken over by Canadian National in 1923.

The tracks this train operated on have changed ownership several times in recent years. Until 1998, the tracks from Montreal to Gaspé were owned by Canadian National Railway (CN). That year, CN sold the lines between Rivière-du-Loup and Matapédia, as well as Matapédia to Gaspé to Quebec Railway Corporation which established two subsidiary companies, the Chemin de fer de la Matapédia et du Golfe (Matapedia and Gulf Railway) and Chemin de fer Baie des Chaleurs (Chaleur Bay Railway) respectively. 

In 2001, CFBC sold the portion of the Matapédia to Gaspé line east of Chandler to Chemin de fer de la Gaspésie (Gaspé Railway) which is owned by local municipalities with maintenance contracted to CFBC. 

In 2007, CFG purchased the remainder of the line from Matapédia to Chandler after the CFBC listed it for abandonment. 

In 2008, CN purchased the CFMG line from Rivière-du-Loup to Matapédia, returning to ownership of this line after QRC encountered financial difficulty.

References

Canadian National Railway
Quebec railways
1907 establishments in Canada
Standard gauge railways in Canada
Railway companies established in 1907
Rail transport in Gaspésie–Îles-de-la-Madeleine